This is a list of lost silent films that were released from 1910 to 1914.

References

Silent, 1910-14
History of film
Lists of 1910s films
1910-related lists
1911-related lists
1912-related lists
1913-related lists
1914-related lists